The 1995 British Isles heat wave occurred between late July and late August. It was part of one of the warmest summers recorded in the UK, and one of the warmest Augusts ever recorded in many locations around the UK, as well as being one of the driest summers ever recorded in the UK; many weather stations recorded the summer of 1995 as drier than, or comparable with, the summer of 1976.

United Kingdom 
In the United Kingdom, the heat wave of 1995 currently marks the warmest August on record, and the third-warmest summer overall, behind 1976 and 1826.

Before the heatwave formed, a mini-heatwave occurred between 28 and 30 June, with a highest temperature recorded during this short period of  recorded on 30 June 1995 at Barbourne, Worcester. Low rainfall was also widely recorded around the nation during the month of June, many stations reporting less than 50% of its average rainfall, with some locations reporting less than 20%.

July 1995 then continued the hot weather, with an average daily temperature of  meaning that it is the seventh-warmest July in the CET records back to 1659. It was very dry too, with most places recording less than 30% of average rainfall. Higher temperatures were recorded in August, though.

During the heatwave, many locations around the UK recorded peak temperatures at the start of August. The highest temperature recorded during the heatwave was  recorded on 1 August 1995 at Boxworth, Cambridgeshire.

Much of the United Kingdom suffered drought conditions during August, with most parts of the UK recording less than 30% of its average rainfall, and most parts of England less than 20%. Many weather stations around the United Kingdom recorded no days of rain to the value of ≥ 1.0 mm.

Aftermath 
After the heat wave ended in August, the east and south of the United Kingdom received high rainfall in September, but another dry spell occurred mainly in the east of the UK. For the rest of 1995, most of the UK received below-average rainfall. Temperatures after the heatwave remained around average for the rest of the year (with further unseasonably warm weather in October), except for a record-breaking cold spell from Christmas to New Year.

Ireland 

While temperatures were lower, Ireland experienced a similar weather pattern to that of the United Kingdom during the summer of 1995.

Like the United Kingdom, Ireland received exceptionally low rainfall, and it was the driest summer on record for the weather stations at Malin Head, Casement Aerodrome and Cork Airport. The overall rainfall recorded during the summer at Phoenix Park was only .

It is currently Ireland's hottest August temperature reading, equalling the measurement at Ballybrittas in County Laois on 3 August 1975.

Impacts 
Like the United Kingdom, Ireland experienced drought conditions throughout the summer, which caused problems to potato farmers in rural areas, as they had difficulty watering crops due to water shortages. Several areas around Ireland were also issued with hosepipe bans, and residents were asked not to hose lawns due to drought conditions.

References 

Heat waves in the United Kingdom
Great Britain and Ireland
Heat Wave
Heat Wave
Heat Wave
Heat Wave